1990–91 Yugoslav Handball Championship was the 39th and last season of the championship due to the break up of Yugoslavia.

First League

First Phase

 Sources: 
 en.wiki, RK Lovćen in the First League 
 Proleter Zrenjanin

Championship play-offs 
Winner: Zagreb Chromos

 Sources: 
 Proleter Zrenjanin

Second league

West 

 Sources: 
 40 godina rukometa u Metkoviću : 1963.-2003.

Third league

SR Croatia

Croatian League – East

 Sources: 
 RK Kaštela Adriachem – 50 godina rukometa u Kaštel Gomilici

Fourth and lower tiers

SR Croatia

Dalmatia league 
Fourth tier of the competition

 Sources: 
 RK Solin – 50 godina rukometa u Solinu 
 RK Hrvatski Dragovoljac Dugi Rat

See also
 Handball Championship of Bosnia and Herzegovina
 Croatian Premier Handball League
 Macedonian Handball Super League
 Montenegrin First League of Men's Handball
 Handball League of Serbia
 Slovenian First League of Handball

Sources 
 Ivan Jurić: 40 godina rukometa u Metkoviću : 1963.-2003., Metković, 2003.
 Jurica Gizdić:RK Kaštela Adriachem – 50 godina rukometa u Kaštel Gomilici, Kaštel Gomilica, 2008.
 en.wiki, RK Lovćen in the First League
 RK Hrvatski Dragovoljac Dugi Rat – Dalmatinska liga 1990./91., rezultati kluba, pristupljeno 9. srpnja 2016.

References

1990-91
handball
handball
Yugoslavia
Handball